Jon Bennison (born 1 December 2002) is a professional rugby league footballer who plays as a er and  for St Helens in the Super League.

Playing career
Throughout the 2021 Under-19s season, Bennison made eight appearances, scoring seven tries across the campaign.

On 17 September 2021, Bennison made his professional debut, scoring a try in St Helens' 26–14 loss to Salford.
On 24 September 2022, Bennison scored a try during St Helens 2022 Super League Grand Final victory over Leeds.

References 

2002 births
Living people
English rugby league players
Rugby league fullbacks
Rugby league players from St Helens, Merseyside
St Helens R.F.C. players